Backstreet Boys: Larger Than Life is the first concert residency by American vocal group Backstreet Boys, performed at Zappos Theater (formerly The AXIS Theater) in the Planet Hollywood Resort & Casino in Las Vegas, Nevada. The show had its opening night on March 1, 2017, and was scheduled to close on April 27, 2019, to start the Backstreet Boys' 11th world tour in May of the same year. Although, AJ McLean stated on the last night of their final show that they will return to Las Vegas after their DNA World Tour, most likely for their 30th anniversary (2023) after what's happened, but Brian Littrell confirmed that they are going sign a longterm deal once the tour is over.

Background and announcement 
On April 1, 2016, member Nick Carter told "Entertainment Tonight" that the group signed a deal with Live Nation for a nine-show "test residency" in Las Vegas. AJ McLean confirmed the deal, telling "Us Weekly" that the residency would begin in January 2017.

On September 23, the Backstreet Boys confirmed their Vegas residency happening in 2017 titled Backstreet Boys: Larger Than Life.

Reception 
According to KVVU-TV 's report, "Backstreet Boys: Larger Than Life" is the fastest-selling residency in Las Vegas in history. It is also the first time that Planet Hollywood has opened up balcony seats for headliner, making the theater 2000 seats bigger than fellow headliners Jennifer Lopez and Britney Spears.

Performance and show elements
The band was backed by an eclectic band of musicians and a DJ, and a complement of ten backup dancers (five male and five female), like their past tour (Into the Millennium Tour). The band would sometimes split up and perform with one member to each side or corner of the stage, but for much of the show, they performed to one side at a time, circling the stage (often as part of the choreographed dancing) throughout each song. A video feed of the show was shown on video screens on both sides of the overhead lighting rig.

The boys began each show in a curtained-off enclosure on the venue's floor. They, dressed in purely white outfits that were reminiscent of their Millennium album cover, first descended from glowing blue and white boxes inside the Axis (now Zappos) theater, and they turned towards the audience before starting the first song, "Larger Than Life." Next, the dancers came out from behind the boxes and performed with them.

The boys used several costume changes during the show. Two versions of these costumes were built: The first encore outfits featured pink and black clothes to match. The later outfits (introduced as of February 2018 on the second leg of the residency) for the encore featured 90s clothes designed for each member. The dancers also wore white encore outfits.

After the first three songs (The One and Get Down (You're the One for Me)), A.J. McLean would greet the audience as Nick Carter would either toss a used sweat towel or a signed water bottle into one of the pit seats. It would be caught by the hands of a fan in the VIP seats (three times he brought his son Odin on stage), and Kevin Richardson would Initially finish by introducing the song "Drowning, followed by "Incomplete" and then "Quit Playing Games (With My Heart)."

A never-before-seen home video montage using "Boys Will Be Boys" allowed the band to change into black sequin suits. Next, an instrumental number featuring the dancers performing a dance number before They were raised on the central platform with mic stands to sing "Show Me The Meaning Of Being Lonely," before coming down to a melody of ballads "I'll Never Break Your Heart," "Anywhere for You" and "Darlin'" (The two songs were later changed to Quit Playing Games). Next, "Undone" featured five female dancers descending the steps to the track while the boys remained on stage until the dancer came down to the band members to do a dance number. Later, Brian Littrell were come out to discuss the song or share about each fan moment. Next, They performed "As Long As You Love Me" with the song's signature "chair routine."

The never-before-seen home videos of the group members' past tours, performances, and award shows with their song "Everyone" was played as the boys changed into red, black, and leather outfits for the next songs "The Call," "We've Got It Goin' On" and "Get Another Boyfriend." Howie Dorough would be the last to talk and thank the fans for supporting them throughout the years of their career. Afterward, the band would sit down on the steps for the next song, "More Than That" (Later shows, they would interact with the audience).

They added matching black fedoras and surprised the audience with the "hat-dance" routine in "All I Have To Give." Then, they come out with roses for the next song, "Shape of My Heart," which they performed and pulled fans, celebrities guests (Former *NSYNC members Joey Fatone and Lance Bass, Snooki from Jersey Shore, Shania Twain, Donny, and Marie Osmond, Perez Hilton, Bachelor contestant Ashley Iaconetti and her then fiancé, now husband Jared Haibon, Backstreet Boys fan,  Aerosmith's Steven Tyler & magician, and illusionist Criss Angel) and love ones from the audience onstage at the end (Brian and AJ had their mothers up at once, then AJ's two daughters on two occasions, Howie sernaded Stacey O'neil, his sister-in-law and wife's sister, Both Brian's and Kevin's wives Kristin and Leighanne came upon two special ones (Richardsons' anniversary and Littrell's birthday), even AJ helped organized a proposal for his friend).

During another costume change, the dancers came out for a dance break for the audience to an up-tempo medley of "Straight Through My Heart" and "It's Gotta Be You." Then, as an Encore, the boys returned to the stage in black (mixed with pink but replaced with blue street clothes later in the show) to perform "I Want It That Way," later adding " Don't Go Breaking My Heart" to the list.

The boys returned once more with the final encore, "Everybody (Backstreet's Back)," often in the same clothes (later switching to their 90s-inspired street clothes). After ending the song, an instrumental outro was played as the boys said their final goodnights and fooled around. Finally, they took a bow to the audience under a blast of confetti and ended the song and the concert. (On Halloween, all five guys dressed in their costumes from the song's music video.)

The final concert saw them headed down to the theater's VIP tables to their best supporting act - their loves and escort them up to the center of to the stage while performing "Shape of My Heart". McLean, and his wife, Rochelle McLean, led the way, with the mom of two wearing a Backstreet Boys T-shirt and appearing emotional by the ballad's end; Carter, and his wife, Lauren, followed, with Lauren also rocking Backstreet Boys merchandise along with light blue hair, then smiling and glowing as Carter sweetly sang to her; Dorough, came next with his stunning wife, Leigh, who slay, strutting down the catwalk while dancing in a sexy white dress during another epic moment from a celebratory birthday weekend; Richardson, followed with his blonde beauty, Kristin, who appeared to be having a blast singing along as the two hit the spotlight; and lastly was Richardson's cousin, Littrell, whose wife, Leighanne, sweetly handed out roses to fans as she made her way to the stage. With that, they concluded by serenading their gorgeous wives as all five couples took to the spotlight In several video footage filmed on Saturday night. At the song's end, the five singers dropped to their knees before handing the ladies long-stemmed roses to pay tribute.

Setlist

"Larger Than Life"
" The One"
" Get Down (You're the One for Me)"
" Drowning" 
"Incomplete"
" Quit Playing Games (with My Heart)"
" Show Me the Meaning of Being Lonely"
" I'll Never Break Your Heart"
" Anywhere for You."
 "Darlin'"
 "Undone"
" As Long as You Love Me"
" The Call"
"  We've Got it Goin' On"
 "Get Another Boyfriend"
" More than That"
" All I Have to Give"
" Shape of My Heart"
"  Don't Go Breaking My Heart"
" I Want It That Way"
"Everybody (Backstreet's Back)"

Shows

Personnel

Lead and Background Vocals — Kevin Richardson, Brian Littrell, Howie Dorough, Nick Carter, AJ McLean
Show Manager: 
Assistant Show Manager: 
Creative direction — Raj Kapoor Productions
Co-Director: 
Musical Director — Keith Harris
Co-Director: 
Video Director — Bert Pare & Garry Odem
Video Engineer / Crew Chief / LED Lead - Caudill Pictures & Entertainment Inc.
Press Liaison: 
Monitor Engineer — Seth Kendall
Tour Accountant: Mark Haworth - Tour Manager and Tour Accountant
Playback Engineer — Romain Garnier
Technical & Production Director- Dan Mercer
Road Manager/Production Coordinator- Kristin Rinden
FOH Engineer- James McCullagh
Monitor Engineer- Seth Kendall
Show Caller- Stephen Nimmer
Stage Manager- David Commisso
Head Carpenter- Jason Deleu
Management — Jennifer "Jenn" Sousa, Ron Laffitte
Lighting Director- Graham Anderson
Tour Accountant — Mark Haworth
Video Director- Bert Pare'
Creative Direction and Design- Raj Kapoor Productions
Director/Co-Production Designer/Screens Producer- Raj Kapoor
Assistant Director/Associate Producer- Rita Maye Bland
Lighting Designer/Co-Production Designer- Richard Neville
Video Content- Silent Partners
Staff Photographer- Justin Segura - VIP Coordinator/Photographer
Musical Director- Keith Harris
Pre-Show Mix- DJ Earworm
Additional Music Production- Varun
Costume Design- Tierney Burchett - Wardrobe
Supervising Choreographer & Choreographer- Nolan Padilla
Assistant Supervising Choreographer- Codie Wiggins
Choreographer-Sharna Burgess***, Chase Benz, Alex Chung, Jojo Gomez, JaQuel Knight, Chuck Maldonado, Tricia Miranda
Iconic Choreography- Rich + Tone, Fatima Robinson, Richard "Swoop" Whitebear

Security
Michael "Mike" Elgani- Nick's Security
Drew Philip- Head of Security/Road Manager/Brian's Security
Aaron Tonga - Howie's Security
Josh Naranjo - AJ's Security
Keith McGuffey- Kevin's Security*

Band
Keyboards - Lance Tolbert, Delvyn Brumfield (Co Musical Director/Keyboards/Synths/Strings)
Guitars - Adam Hawley, Tim Stewart
Bass - Andre Bowman
Drums - 
Keith Harris - Musical Director/Drums/Keyboards
Vocal Producer - David "DQ" Quinones
Drum Programming/Arranger - Adrian "DJ Dubz" Wiltshire
Programmer/Arranger - Kevin Teasley
Engineer - John D Norten, Rico Simmons

Dancers
Floris Bosveld (Dance Captain)
Hailee Payne (Female Dance Captain)
Valentino Vladimirov
Teddy Coffey
Steven Charles (2017-2018)****
Jian Pierre-Louis
Brooke Maroon
Alyx Andrushuk
Yorelis Apolinario (2017-2018)****
Lindsey Desrosiers
James Marino (2018-2019)****
Genise Ruidiaz (2018-2019)****

Legal and Business Management
Keller, Turner, Ruth, Andrew & Ghanem, PLLC
Jordan S. Keller
W. Chris Andrews
Sarah A. Smith
Meredith McGinnis
Lindsay Brooker

Booking Agency
William Morris Endeavor
John Marx
Brian Cohen

Vendors
Lighting and Video- Production Resources Group
Audio: Sound Image
Automation and Staging- Show Group Production Services
Fan Club & VIP Experience- Wonderful Union
ER Productions
Quantum SFX
Jason Deleu

Touring Partners
Live Nation
Michael Rapino
Steve Herman
Kurt Melien
Amanda Moore

Public Relations
Caravan PR- Steven Trachtenbroit
Edge Publicity- Shoshanna Stone

Fan Engagement and Website Design
Wonderful Union
Eddie Meehan
Kat Gilbride
Jennie Quan
Justin Segura
Matt Sergent
Matt Ferro
Chad Turner
Nate Gabriel
Mason Mullendore
Anthony Ordonez
Eric Warren

Wardrobe Contributors
Magnanni Shoes
Express
Creative Recreation
MAC Makeup
AG Hair
JakiMac
Emporio Armani
Coach

Caesars Entertainment
Jason Gastwirth
Talia Rothman
Gavin Whiteley
Edward Tex Dike
John Demos

Merchandise Company
Global Merchandising
Barry Drinkwater
Jen Florez
Tracy Stone

Digital Marketing and Social Media Management
Crowd Surf
Cassie Petrey
Jade Driver
Helen Showalter

Travel Agent
Preferred Travel
Nancy Rosenblatt
Debbie Rosenblatt

Afterparty Venue

Chateau Nightclub and Rooftop

Clips from BACKSTREET BOYS – SHOW 'EM WHAT YOU'RE MADE OF
feature film (c) Pulse Films/K Bahn LLC 2015 and BSB personal archives

Special Thanks:
Millennium Dance Complex
Warner Bros. Studios
JetSuiteX
Master Chefs Production Catering
Sennheiser - For providing wireless microphones.

Notes
Keith, known as Trey D, is an old friend of Kevin's from Kentucky
indicates which songs were part of a medley
Sharna was Nick's dance partner on Dancing with the stars
indicates which dancer did two years during the residency

References

External links 

 

Larger Than Life
Concert residencies in the Las Vegas Valley
2017 concert residencies
2018 concert residencies
2019 concert residencies
Zappos Theater